Metroweb Italia S.p.A. (was known as F2i Reti TLC S.p.A., abb. of Fondi Italiani per le Infrastrutture Reti Telecomunicazione Società per Azioni) was an Italian holding company specializing in internet and communication services through fiber optics. The company was a joint venture of F2i First Fund (53.83%) and CDP Equity (46.17% via FSI Investimenti S.p.A.), a private equity and a sovereign wealth fund respectively. In 2016 Enel acquired a stake in the company via Enel OpEn Fiber (EOF), with Cassa Depositi e Prestiti retained 50% stake in EOF.

Metroweb Italia was the owner of F2i Metropolis S.p.A. which was an intermediate holding company of Metroweb. F2i Metropolis was revered merger with Metroweb on 1 January 2012. Intesa Sanpaolo was a minority shareholders of Metroweb Italia for 12.5% stake, but sold the shares to F2i for €20 million. After the transaction, FSI formally subscribed the capital increase of Metroweb Italia, to become the new minority shareholders.

In October 2012, Metroweb Italia acquired the controlling interests (85%) in Genoese company Saster Net S.p.A., which was renamed to Metroweb Genova S.p.A.

In April 2015 a takeover bid from Telecom Italia was rejected.

References

External links
 

Telecommunications companies of Italy
Companies based in Milan
Defunct companies of Italy
Telecommunications companies established in 2011
Technology companies disestablished in 2016
2011 establishments in Italy
2016 disestablishments in Italy
Government-owned companies of Italy
Private equity portfolio companies